Pir Qoli (also Romanized as Pīr Qolī) is a village in Charuymaq-e Sharqi Rural District, Shadian District, Charuymaq County, East Azerbaijan Province, Iran. At the time of 2006 census, its population was 99, in 17 families.

References 

Populated places in Charuymaq County